Thomas Zimmerman (1838–1914) was a writer and translator.

Thomas Zimmerman may also refer to:
Thomas G. Zimmerman, inventor of the data glove
Thomas F. Zimmerman (1912–1991), General Superintendent of the Assemblies of God

See also
Deadmau5 (Joel Thomas Zimmerman, born 1981), Canadian music producer, DJ, and musician